Charles Mingus Jr. (April 22, 1922 – January 5, 1979) was an American jazz upright bassist, pianist, composer, bandleader, and author. A major proponent of collective improvisation, he is considered to be one of the greatest jazz musicians and composers in history, with a career spanning three decades and collaborations with other jazz musicians such as Louis Armstrong, Duke Ellington, Charlie Parker, Dizzy Gillespie, and Herbie Hancock. Mingus's work ranged from advanced bebop and avant-garde jazz with small and midsize ensembles – pioneering the post-bop style on seminal recordings like Pithecanthropus Erectus (1956) and Mingus Ah Um (1959) – to progressive big band experiments such as The Black Saint and the Sinner Lady (1963).

Mingus's compositions continue to be played by contemporary musicians ranging from the repertory bands Mingus Big Band, Mingus Dynasty, and Mingus Orchestra, to the high school students who play the charts and compete in the Charles Mingus High School Competition. In 1993, the Library of Congress acquired Mingus's collected papers—including scores, sound recordings, correspondence and photos—in what they described as "the most important acquisition of a manuscript collection relating to jazz in the Library's history".

Biography

Early life and career
Charles Mingus was born in Nogales, Arizona. His father, Charles Mingus Sr., was a sergeant in the U.S. Army. Mingus Junior was largely raised in the Watts area of Los Angeles. His maternal grandfather was a Chinese British subject from Hong Kong, and his maternal grandmother was an African-American from the southern United States. Mingus was the great-great-great-grandson of the family's founding patriarch who was, by most accounts, a German immigrant. His ancestry included German American, African American, and Native American.

In Mingus's autobiography Beneath the Underdog his mother was described as "the daughter of an English/Chinese man and a South-American woman", and his father was the son "of a black farm worker and a Swedish woman". Charles Mingus Sr. claims to have been raised by his mother and her husband as a white person until he was fourteen, when his mother revealed to her family that the child's true father was a black slave, after which he had to run away from his family and live on his own. The autobiography does not confirm whether Charles Mingus Sr. or Mingus himself believed this story was true, or whether it was merely an embellished version of the Mingus family's lineage.

His mother allowed only church-related music in their home, but Mingus developed an early love for other music, especially Duke Ellington. He studied trombone, and later cello, although he was unable to follow the cello professionally because, at the time, it was nearly impossible for a black musician to make a career of classical music, and the cello was not yet accepted as a jazz instrument. Despite this, Mingus was still attached to the cello; as he studied bass with Red Callender in the late 1930s, Callender even commented that the cello was still Mingus's main instrument. In Beneath the Underdog, Mingus states that he did not actually start learning bass until Buddy Collette accepted him into his swing band under the stipulation that he be the band's bass player.

Due to a poor education, the young Mingus could not read musical notation quickly enough to join the local youth orchestra. This had a serious impact on his early musical experiences, leaving him feeling ostracized from the classical music world. These early experiences, in addition to his lifelong confrontations with racism, were reflected in his music, which often focused on themes of racism, discrimination and (in)justice.

Much of the cello technique he learned was applicable to double bass when he took up the instrument in high school. He studied for five years with Herman Reinshagen, principal bassist of the New York Philharmonic, and compositional techniques with Lloyd Reese. Throughout much of his career, he played a bass made in 1927 by the German maker Ernst Heinrich Roth.

Beginning in his teen years, Mingus was writing quite advanced pieces; many are similar to Third Stream because they incorporate elements of classical music. A number of them were recorded in 1960 with conductor Gunther Schuller, and released as Pre-Bird, referring to Charlie "Bird" Parker; Mingus was one of many musicians whose perspectives on music were altered by Parker into "pre- and post-Bird" eras.

Mingus gained a reputation as a bass prodigy. His first major professional job was playing with former Ellington clarinetist Barney Bigard. He toured with Louis Armstrong in 1943, and by early 1945 was recording in Los Angeles in a band led by Russell Jacquet, which also included Teddy Edwards, Maurice Simon, Bill Davis, and Chico Hamilton, and in May that year, in Hollywood, again with Teddy Edwards, in a band led by Howard McGhee.

He then played with Lionel Hampton's band in the late 1940s; Hampton performed and recorded several of Mingus pieces. A popular trio of Mingus, Red Norvo and Tal Farlow in 1950 and 1951 received considerable acclaim, but Mingus's race caused problems with club owners and he left the group. Mingus was briefly a member of Ellington's band in 1953, as a substitute for bassist Wendell Marshall. Mingus's notorious temper led to his being one of the few musicians personally fired by Ellington (Bubber Miley and drummer Bobby Durham are among the others), after a backstage fight between Mingus and Juan Tizol.

Also in the early 1950s, before attaining commercial recognition as a bandleader, Mingus played gigs with Charlie Parker, whose compositions and improvisations greatly inspired and influenced him. Mingus considered Parker the greatest genius and innovator in jazz history, but he had a love-hate relationship with Parker's legacy. Mingus blamed the Parker mythology for a derivative crop of pretenders to Parker's throne. He was also conflicted and sometimes disgusted by Parker's self-destructive habits and the romanticized lure of drug addiction they offered to other jazz musicians. In response to the many sax players who imitated Parker, Mingus titled a song "If Charlie Parker Were a Gunslinger, There'd Be a Whole Lot of Dead Copycats" (released on Mingus Dynasty as "Gunslinging Bird").

Mingus was married four times. His wives were Jeanne Gross, Lucille (Celia) Germanis, Judy Starkey, and Susan Graham Ungaro.

Based in New York
In 1952, Mingus co-founded Debut Records with Max Roach so he could conduct his recording career as he saw fit. The name originated from his desire to document unrecorded young musicians. Despite this, the best-known recording the company issued was of the most prominent figures in bebop. On May 15, 1953, Mingus joined Dizzy Gillespie, Parker, Bud Powell, and Roach for a concert at Massey Hall in Toronto, which is the last recorded documentation of Gillespie and Parker playing together. After the event, Mingus chose to overdub his barely audible bass part back in New York; the original version was issued later. The two 10" albums of the Massey Hall concert (one featured the trio of Powell, Mingus and Roach) were among Debut Records' earliest releases. Mingus may have objected to the way the major record companies treated musicians, but Gillespie once commented that he did not receive any royalties "for years and years" for his Massey Hall appearance. The records, however, are often regarded as among the finest live jazz recordings.

One story has it that Mingus was involved in a notorious incident while playing a 1955 club date billed as a "reunion" with Parker, Powell, and Roach. Powell, who suffered from alcoholism and mental illness (possibly exacerbated by a severe police beating and electroshock treatments), had to be helped from the stage, unable to play or speak coherently. As Powell's incapacitation became apparent, Parker stood in one spot at a microphone, chanting "Bud Powell ... Bud Powell ..." as if beseeching Powell's return. Allegedly, Parker continued this incantation for several minutes after Powell's departure, to his own amusement and Mingus's exasperation. Mingus took another microphone and announced to the crowd, "Ladies and Gentlemen, please don't associate me with any of this. This is not jazz. These are sick people." This was Parker's last public performance; about a week later he died after years of substance abuse.

Mingus often worked with a mid-sized ensemble (around 8–10 members) of rotating musicians known as the Jazz Workshop. Mingus broke new ground, constantly demanding that his musicians be able to explore and develop their perceptions on the spot. Those who joined the Workshop (or Sweatshops as they were colorfully dubbed by the musicians) included Pepper Adams, Jaki Byard, Booker Ervin, John Handy, Jimmy Knepper, Charles McPherson and Horace Parlan. Mingus shaped these musicians into a cohesive improvisational machine that in many ways anticipated free jazz. Some musicians dubbed the workshop a "university" for jazz.

Pithecanthropus Erectus and other recordings
The 1950s are generally regarded as Mingus's most productive and fertile period. Over a ten-year period, he made 30 records for a number of labels (Atlantic, Candid, Columbia, Impulse and others). Mingus had already recorded around ten albums as a bandleader, but 1956 was a breakthrough year for him, with the release of Pithecanthropus Erectus, arguably his first major work as both a bandleader and composer. Like Ellington, Mingus wrote songs with specific musicians in mind, and his band for Erectus included adventurous musicians: piano player Mal Waldron, alto saxophonist Jackie McLean and the Sonny Rollins-influenced tenor of J. R. Monterose. The title song is a ten-minute tone poem, depicting the rise of man from his hominid roots (Pithecanthropus erectus) to an eventual downfall. A section of the piece was free improvisation, free of structure or theme.

Another album from this period, The Clown (1957, also on Atlantic Records), the title track of which features narration by humorist Jean Shepherd, was the first to feature drummer Dannie Richmond, who remained his preferred drummer until Mingus's death in 1979. The two men formed one of the most impressive and versatile rhythm sections in jazz. Both were accomplished performers seeking to stretch the boundaries of their music while staying true to its roots. When joined by pianist Jaki Byard, they were dubbed "The Almighty Three".

Mingus Ah Um and other works
In 1959, Mingus and his jazz workshop musicians recorded one of his best-known albums, Mingus Ah Um. Even in a year of standout masterpieces, including Dave Brubeck's Time Out, Miles Davis's Kind of Blue, John Coltrane's Giant Steps, and Ornette Coleman's The Shape of Jazz to Come, this was a major achievement, featuring such classic Mingus compositions as "Goodbye Pork Pie Hat" (an elegy to Lester Young) and the vocal-less version of "Fables of Faubus" (a protest against segregationist Arkansas governor Orval Faubus that features double-time sections). In 2003 the album's legacy was cemented when it was inducted into the National Recording Registry. Also during 1959, Mingus recorded the album Blues & Roots, which was released the following year. Mingus said in his liner notes: "I was born swinging and clapped my hands in church as a little boy, but I've grown up and I like to do things other than just swing. But blues can do more than just swing."

Mingus witnessed Ornette Coleman's legendary—and controversial—1960 appearances at New York City's Five Spot jazz club. He initially expressed rather mixed feelings for Coleman's innovative music: "... if the free-form guys could play the same tune twice, then I would say they were playing something ... Most of the time they use their fingers on the saxophone and they don't even know what's going to come out. They're experimenting." That same year, however, Mingus formed a quartet with Richmond, trumpeter Ted Curson and multi-instrumentalist Eric Dolphy. This ensemble featured the same instruments as Coleman's quartet, and is often regarded as Mingus rising to the challenging new standard established by Coleman. The quartet recorded on both Charles Mingus Presents Charles Mingus and Mingus. The former also features the version of "Fables of Faubus" with lyrics, aptly titled "Original Faubus Fables".

In 1961, Mingus spent time staying at the house of his mother's sister (Louise) and her husband, Fess Williams, a clarinetist and saxophonist, in Jamaica, Queens. Subsequently, Mingus invited Williams to play at the 1962 Town Hall Concert.

Only one misstep occurred in this era: The Town Hall Concert in October 1962, a "live workshop"/recording session. With an ambitious program, the event was plagued with troubles from its inception. Mingus's vision, now known as Epitaph, was finally realized by conductor Gunther Schuller in a concert in 1989, a decade after Mingus died.

Outside of music, Mingus published a mail-order how-to guide in 1954 called The Charles Mingus CAT-alog for Toilet Training Your Cat. The guide explained in detail how to get a cat to use a human toilet. Sixty years later, in 2014, the late American character actor Reg E. Cathey performed a voice recording of the complete guide for Studio 360.

The Black Saint and the Sinner Lady and other Impulse! albums
In 1963, Mingus released The Black Saint and the Sinner Lady, described as "one of the greatest achievements in orchestration by any composer in jazz history." The album was also unique in that Mingus asked his psychotherapist, Dr. Edmund Pollock, to provide notes for the record.

Mingus also released Mingus Plays Piano, an unaccompanied album featuring some fully improvised pieces, in 1963.

In addition, 1963 saw the release of Mingus Mingus Mingus Mingus Mingus, an album praised by critic Nat Hentoff.

In 1964 Mingus put together one of his best-known groups, a sextet including Dannie Richmond, Jaki Byard, Eric Dolphy, trumpeter Johnny Coles, and tenor saxophonist Clifford Jordan. The group was recorded frequently during its short existence. Mosaic Records has released a 7-CD set, Charles Mingus – The Jazz Workshop Concerts 1964–65, featuring concerts from Town Hall, Amsterdam, Monterey ’64, Monterey ’65, & Minneapolis). Coles fell ill and left during a European tour. Dolphy stayed in Europe after the tour ended, and died suddenly in Berlin on June 28, 1964. 1964 was also the year that Mingus met his future wife, Sue Graham Ungaro. The couple were married in 1966 by Allen Ginsberg. Facing financial hardship, Mingus was evicted from his New York home in 1966.

Changes
Mingus's pace slowed somewhat in the late 1960s and early 1970s. In 1974, after his 1970 sextet with Charles McPherson, Eddie Preston and Bobby Jones disbanded, he formed a quintet with Richmond, pianist Don Pullen, trumpeter Jack Walrath and saxophonist George Adams. They recorded two well-received albums, Changes One and Changes Two. Mingus also played with Charles McPherson in many of his groups during this time. Cumbia and Jazz Fusion in 1976 sought to blend Colombian music (the "Cumbia" of the title) with more traditional jazz forms. In 1971, Mingus taught for a semester at the University at Buffalo, The State University of New York as the Slee Professor of Music.

Later career and death
By the mid-1970s, Mingus was suffering from amyotrophic lateral sclerosis (ALS). His once formidable bass technique declined until he could no longer play the instrument. He continued composing, however, and supervised a number of recordings before his death. At the time of his death, he was working with Joni Mitchell on an album eventually titled Mingus, which included lyrics added by Mitchell to his compositions, including "Goodbye Pork Pie Hat". The album featured the talents of Wayne Shorter, Herbie Hancock, and another influential bassist and composer, Jaco Pastorius.

Mingus died on January 5, 1979, aged 56, in Cuernavaca, Mexico, where he had traveled for treatment and convalescence. His ashes were scattered in the Ganges River.

Musical style 
His compositions retained the hot and soulful feel of hard bop, drawing heavily from black gospel music and blues, while sometimes containing elements of Third Stream, free jazz, and classical music. He once cited Duke Ellington and church as his main influences.

Mingus espoused collective improvisation, similar to the old New Orleans jazz parades, paying particular attention to how each band member interacted with the group as a whole. In creating his bands, he looked not only at the skills of the available musicians, but also their personalities. Many musicians passed through his bands and later went on to impressive careers. He recruited talented and sometimes little-known artists, whom he utilized to assemble unconventional instrumental configurations. As a performer, Mingus was a pioneer in double bass technique, widely recognized as one of the instrument's most proficient players.

Because of his brilliant writing for midsize ensembles, and his catering to and emphasizing the strengths of the musicians in his groups, Mingus is often considered the heir of Duke Ellington, for whom he expressed great admiration and collaborated on the record Money Jungle. Dizzy Gillespie had once said Mingus reminded him "of a young Duke", citing their shared "organizational genius".

Personality and temper
Nearly as well known as his ambitious music was Mingus's often fearsome temperament, which earned him the nickname "The Angry Man of Jazz". His refusal to compromise his musical integrity led to many onstage eruptions, exhortations to musicians, and dismissals. Although respected for his musical talents, Mingus was sometimes feared for his occasionally violent onstage temper, which was at times directed at members of his band and other times aimed at the audience. He was physically large, prone to obesity (especially in his later years), and was by all accounts often intimidating and frightening when expressing anger or displeasure. When confronted with a nightclub audience talking and clinking ice in their glasses while he performed, Mingus stopped his band and loudly chastised the audience, stating: "Isaac Stern doesn't have to put up with this shit." Mingus destroyed a $20,000 bass in response to audience heckling at the Five Spot in New York City.

Guitarist and singer Jackie Paris was a witness to Mingus's irascibility. Paris recalls his time in the Jazz Workshop: "He chased everybody off the stand except [drummer] Paul Motian and me ... The three of us just wailed on the blues for about an hour and a half before he called the other cats back."

On October 12, 1962, Mingus punched Jimmy Knepper in the mouth while the two men were working together at Mingus's apartment on a score for his upcoming concert at The Town Hall in New York, and Knepper refused to take on more work. Mingus's blow broke off a crowned tooth and its underlying stub. According to Knepper, this ruined his embouchure and resulted in the permanent loss of the top octave of his range on the trombone – a significant handicap for any professional trombonist. This attack temporarily ended their working relationship, and Knepper was unable to perform at the concert. Charged with assault, Mingus appeared in court in January 1963 and was given a suspended sentence. Knepper did again work with Mingus in 1977 and played extensively with the Mingus Dynasty, formed after Mingus's death in 1979.

In addition to bouts of ill temper, Mingus was prone to clinical depression and tended to have brief periods of extreme creative activity intermixed with fairly long stretches of greatly decreased output, such as the five-year period following the death of Eric Dolphy.

In 1966, Mingus was evicted from his apartment at 5 Great Jones Street in New York City for nonpayment of rent, captured in the 1968 documentary film Mingus: Charlie Mingus 1968, directed by Thomas Reichman. The film also features Mingus performing in clubs and in the apartment, firing a .410 shotgun indoors, composing at the piano, playing with and taking care of his young daughter Caroline, and discussing love, art, politics, and the music school he had hoped to create.

Legacy

The Mingus Big Band
Charles Mingus's music is currently being performed and reinterpreted by the Mingus Big Band, which in October 2008 began playing every Monday at Jazz Standard in New York City, and often tours the rest of the U.S. and Europe. The Mingus Big Band, the Mingus Orchestra, and the Mingus Dynasty band are managed by Jazz Workshop, Inc. and run by Mingus's widow, Sue Graham Mingus.

Elvis Costello has written lyrics for a few Mingus pieces. He had once sung lyrics for one piece, "Invisible Lady", backed by the Mingus Big Band on the album, Tonight at Noon: Three of Four Shades of Love.

Epitaph
Epitaph is considered one of Charles Mingus's masterpieces. The composition is 4,235 measures long, requires two hours to perform, and is one of the longest jazz pieces ever written. Epitaph was only completely discovered, by musicologist Andrew Homzy, during the cataloging process after Mingus's death. With the help of a grant from the Ford Foundation, the score and instrumental parts were copied, and the piece itself was premiered by a 30-piece orchestra, conducted by Gunther Schuller. This concert was produced by Mingus's widow, Sue Graham Mingus, at Alice Tully Hall on June 3, 1989, 10 years after Mingus's death. It was performed again at several concerts in 2007. The performance at Walt Disney Concert Hall is available on NPR. Hal Leonard published the complete score in 2008.

Autobiography
Mingus wrote the sprawling, exaggerated, quasi-autobiography, Beneath the Underdog: His World as Composed by Mingus, throughout the 1960s, and it was published in 1971. Its "stream of consciousness" style covered several aspects of his life that had previously been off-record. In addition to his musical and intellectual proliferation, Mingus goes into great detail about his perhaps overstated sexual exploits. He claims to have had more than 31 affairs in the course of his life (including 26 prostitutes in one sitting). This does not include any of his five wives (he claims to have been married to two of them simultaneously). In addition, he asserts that he held a brief career as a pimp. This has never been confirmed.

Mingus's autobiography also serves as an insight into his psyche, as well as his attitudes about race and society. It includes accounts of abuse at the hands of his father from an early age, being bullied as a child, his removal from a white musician's union, and grappling with disapproval while married to white women and other examples of the hardship and prejudice.

Scholarly influence
The work of Charles Mingus has also received attention in academia. According to Ashon Crawley, the musicianship of Charles Mingus provides a salient example of the power of music to unsettle the dualistic, categorical distinction of sacred from profane through otherwise epistemologies. Crawley offers a reading of Mingus that examines the deep imbrication uniting Holiness – Pentecostal aesthetic practices and jazz. Mingus recognized the importance and impact of the midweek gathering of black folks at the Holiness – Pentecostal Church at 79th and Watts in Los Angeles that he would attend with his stepmother or his friend Britt Woodman. Crawley goes on to argue that these visits were the impetus for the song "Wednesday Prayer Meeting". Emphasis is placed on the ethical demand of the prayer meeting felt and experienced that, according to Crawley, Mingus attempts to capture. In many ways, "Wednesday Night Prayer Meeting" was Mingus's homage to black sociality. By exploring Mingus's homage to black Pentecostal aesthetics, Crawley expounds on how Mingus figured out that those Holiness – Pentecostal gatherings were the constant repetition of the ongoing, deep, intense mode of study, a kind of study wherein the aesthetic forms created could not be severed from the intellectual practice because they were one and also, but not, the same." 

Gunther Schuller has suggested that Mingus should be ranked among the most important American composers, jazz or otherwise. In 1988, a grant from the National Endowment for the Arts made possible the cataloging of Mingus compositions, which were then donated to the Music Division of the New York Public Library for public use. In 1993, The Library of Congress acquired Mingus's collected papers—including scores, sound recordings, correspondence and photos—in what they described as "the most important acquisition of a manuscript collection relating to jazz in the Library's history".

Cover versions
Considering the number of compositions that Charles Mingus wrote, his works have not been recorded as often as comparable jazz composers. The only Mingus tribute albums recorded during his lifetime were baritone saxophonist Pepper Adams's album, Pepper Adams Plays the Compositions of Charlie Mingus, in 1963, and Joni Mitchell's album Mingus, in 1979. Of all his works, his elegy for Lester Young, "Goodbye Pork Pie Hat" (from Mingus Ah Um) has probably had the most recordings. The song has been covered by both jazz and non-jazz artists, such as Jeff Beck, Andy Summers, Eugene Chadbourne, and Bert Jansch and John Renbourn with and without Pentangle. Joni Mitchell sang a version with lyrics that she wrote for it.

Elvis Costello has recorded "Hora Decubitus" (from Mingus Mingus Mingus Mingus Mingus) on My Flame Burns Blue (2006). "Better Git It in Your Soul" was covered by Davey Graham on his album "Folk, Blues, and Beyond". Trumpeter Ron Miles performs a version of "Pithecanthropus Erectus" on his CD "Witness". New York Ska Jazz Ensemble has done a cover of Mingus's "Haitian Fight Song", as have the British folk rock group Pentangle and others. Hal Willner's 1992 tribute album Weird Nightmare: Meditations on Mingus (Columbia Records) contains idiosyncratic renditions of Mingus's works involving numerous popular musicians including Chuck D, Keith Richards, Henry Rollins and Dr. John. The Italian band Quintorigo recorded an entire album devoted to Mingus's music, titled Play Mingus.

Gunther Schuller's edition of Mingus's "Epitaph", which premiered at Lincoln Center in 1989, was subsequently released on Columbia/Sony Records.

One of the most elaborate tributes to Mingus came on September 29, 1969, at a festival honoring him. Duke Ellington performed The Clown, with Ellington reading Jean Shepherd's narration. It was long believed that no recording of this performance existed; however, one was discovered and premiered on July 11, 2013, by Dry River Jazz host Trevor Hodgkins for NPR member station KRWG-FM with re-airings on July 13, 2013, and July 26, 2014. Mingus's elegy for Duke, "Duke Ellington's Sound Of Love", was recorded by Kevin Mahogany on Double Rainbow (1993) and Anita Wardell on Why Do You Cry? (1995).

Awards and honors
 1971: Guggenheim Fellowship (Music Composition).
 1971: Inducted in the Down Beat Jazz Hall of Fame.
 1988: The National Endowment for the Arts provided grants for a Mingus nonprofit called "Let My Children Hear Music" which cataloged all of Mingus's works. The microfilms of these works were given to the Music Division of the New York Public Library where they are currently available for study.
 1993: The Library of Congress acquired Mingus's collected papers—including scores, sound recordings, correspondence and photos—in what they described as "the most important acquisition of a manuscript collection relating to jazz in the Library's history".
 1995: The United States Postal Service issued a stamp in his honor.
 1997: Posthumously awarded the Grammy Lifetime Achievement Award.
 1999: Album Mingus Dynasty (1959) inducted in the Grammy Hall of Fame.
 2005: Inducted in the Jazz at Lincoln Center, Nesuhi Ertegun Jazz Hall of Fame.

Discography

Filmography
 1959, Mingus contributed most of the music for John Cassavetes's gritty New York City film Shadows.
 1961, Mingus appeared as a bassist and actor in the British film All Night Long.
 1968, Thomas Reichman directed the documentary Mingus: Charlie Mingus 1968.
 1991, Ray Davies produced a documentary entitled Weird Nightmare. It contains footage of Mingus and interviews with artists making Hal Willner's tribute album of the same name, including Elvis Costello, Charlie Watts, Keith Richards, and Vernon Reid.
 1998, Charles Mingus: Triumph of the Underdog (78 minutes) a documentary film on Charles Mingus directed by Don McGlynn.

References

Further reading
 Coleman, Janet, and Young, Al. Mingus/Mingus: Two Memoirs. Limelight Editions (2004) 
 Dyer, Geoff. But Beautiful: A Book About Jazz. Abacus (2006) pp. 103–127 
 Jenkins, Todd S. I Know What I Know: The Music of Charles Mingus, Praeger (2006) 
 Mingus, Charles. Charles Mingus – More Than a Fake Book, Hal Leonard (1991) 
 Mingus, Charles. Beneath the Underdog
 Mingus, Sue Graham. Tonight at Noon: A Love Story, Da Capo reprint (2003) 
 Priestley, Brian. Mingus: A Critical Biography, Da Capo Press (1984) 
 Santoro, Gene. Myself When I Am Real: The Life and Music of Charles Mingus, Oxford University Press (2001)

External links

 
 
 "Charles Mingus" by Nat Hentoff
 "Charles Mingus: Requiem for the Underdog" by Alan Goldsher
 
 Howard Fischer collection of Charles Mingus correspondence and legal documents, 1959, 1965-1967 at Isham Memorial Library, Harvard University

 
1922 births
1979 deaths
20th-century American composers
20th-century American pianists
20th-century double-bassists
20th-century jazz composers
African-American people
American autobiographers
American jazz bandleaders
American jazz double-bassists
American male pianists
American musicians of Chinese descent
American people of English descent
American people of German descent
American people of Hong Kong descent
American people of Swedish descent
American people who self-identify as being of Native American descent
Atlantic Records artists
Avant-garde jazz double-bassists
Bebop double-bassists
Big band bandleaders
Candid Records artists
Columbia Records artists
Deaths from motor neuron disease
Neurological disease deaths in Mexico
Grammy Lifetime Achievement Award winners
Male double-bassists
Mercury Records artists
Musicians from Arizona
Musicians from Los Angeles
People from Nogales, Arizona
People from Watts, Los Angeles
Post-bop double-bassists
Progressive big band bandleaders
Savoy Records artists
Third stream musicians
University at Buffalo faculty
20th-century American male musicians